Expedición Robinson: La Isla Vip was the Chilean version of the American reality television game show Survivor. The show premiered on July 19, 2006, and was recorded in the Dominican Republic and edited in Argentina. On October 16 Marcela Roberts won the final duel between Fabricio Vasconcellos winning $50.000.000.

Contestants

The Total Votes is the number of votes a castaway has received during Tribal Councils where the castaway is eligible to be voted out of the game. It does not include the votes received during the final Tribal Council.

The game

Voting history

Chilean reality television series
2006 Chilean television series debuts
2006 Chilean television series endings
Television shows filmed in the Dominican Republic
Survivor (franchise) seasons